George Radcliffe was an English footballer who played as a forward. He played for Manchester United in 1899.

External links
Profile at MUFCInfo.com

English footballers
Manchester United F.C. players
Year of birth missing
Year of death missing
Association football forwards